Trevor Boudreau is a Canadian politician, who was elected to the Nova Scotia House of Assembly in the 2021 Nova Scotia general election. He represents the riding of Richmond as a member of the Progressive Conservative Association of Nova Scotia.

Boudreau, a chiropractor, previously served as a municipal councillor and deputy mayor in Port Hawkesbury.

References

Year of birth missing (living people)
Living people
Progressive Conservative Association of Nova Scotia MLAs
21st-century Canadian politicians
Canadian chiropractors
Nova Scotia municipal councillors
People from Richmond County, Nova Scotia